Dargan is a village in the Central West region of New South Wales, Australia. The village is located in the local government area of the City of Lithgow.

References

Towns in New South Wales
City of Lithgow
Communities in the Blue Mountains (New South Wales)